Fildes is an English toponymic surname from the regional name Fylde, the western part of the area Amounderness Hundred in Lancashire, England. The final -s appears to be a post-medieval excrescence. Notable people with the surname include:

 Albert Fildes, British rugby league footballer
 Audrey Fildes (1922–1997), British actress
 Henry Fildes (1870–1948), British politician
 Horace Edward Manners Fildes (1875–1937), New Zealand book collector
 John Fildes (1811–1875), British businessman and politician
 Luke Fildes (1843–1927), British painter
 Luke Fildes (fencer) (1879–1970), British fencer
 Mary Fildes (1789–1876), British activist
 Paul Fildes (1882–1971), British pathologist and microbiologist
 Robin Fildes (born 1940), Australian rules footballer

See also

References 

English toponymic surnames